The Dayton Ducks were a minor league baseball team that played in the Central League in 1932 and then the Middle Atlantic League from 1933–1942. The team took its name from their owner and field manager, former St. Louis Cardinals player Ducky Holmes. They were affiliated with the Brooklyn Dodgers from 1934–35, 1938–1942 and the Chicago White Sox in 1937. The team was briefly known as the Dayton Wings from 1939–1940, when Holmes was not involved with the club.

The ballparks

The team played at North Side Field and then Hudson Field.  North side field was located at Leo Street and Troy Pike. Hudson Field was located at West Third Street and was near the Soldiers Home.

Notable alumni
 Como Cotelle (1940)
 Rod Dedeaux (1935) Manager: 11 x NCAA College World Series Champion USC Trojans
 Frank McCormick (1935) 9 x MLB All-Star; 1940 NL Most Valuable Player
 Dick Siebert (1932, 1934) MLB All-Star
 Phil Weintraub (1932)

References

External links
Dayton Baseball History

Defunct minor league baseball teams
Defunct baseball teams in Ohio
Baseball in Dayton, Ohio
Brooklyn Dodgers minor league affiliates
Chicago White Sox minor league affiliates
1932 establishments in Ohio
1942 disestablishments in Ohio
Baseball teams established in 1932
Baseball teams disestablished in 1942
Central League teams
Middle Atlantic League teams